Mylothris alberici is a butterfly in the family Pieridae. It is found in western Uganda, Rwanda, and the Democratic Republic of the Congo (Kivu). The habitat consists of forests.

References

Butterflies described in 1940
Pierini